Qasemabad (also Romanized as Qāsemābād) is a village in Hana Rural District, Abadeh Tashk District, Neyriz County, Fars Province, Iran. At the 2006 census, its population was 643, in 146 families.

References 

Populated places in Abadeh Tashk County